Dirasha (also known as Ghidole, Diraasha, Dirayta, Gidole, Gardulla, Dhirasha) is a member of the Cushitic branch of the Afro-Asiatic family. It is spoken in the Omo region of Ethiopia, in the hills west of Lake Chamo, around the town of Gidole.

A number of speakers also use Oromo or Konso. According to Wondwosen, the "Dirasha" is the name of the people, and the name of the language is given variously as "Dirashitata, Dirayta and Diraytata" (2006:3,4).

The language has a three ejective consonant phonemes and two implosive consonant phonemes, fitting the pattern of the Ethiopian Language Area. It has two tones and five vowels.  Duration (or gemination) is distinctive for both consonants and vowels (Wondwosen 2006:9,10).

Phonology

Phonetic Inventory: Consonant IPA Symbols 
Dirayta transcription utilizes symbols that differ from those of the traditional IPA chart. Each ejective may be written two ways.

When /n/ and /ʔ/ occur as /nʔ/, they contract to form ŋ. /n/ and /ʔ/ must occur in that sequence, with no intervening vowels or consonants.

Phonetic Inventory: Vowel IPA Symbols

Low and High Tones 
-Dirayta is a 2-tone language.

-Low Tone: Absence of accentual markings

-High Tone: Represented by acute accent diacritic above vowel (í, é, á, ú, ó, ɔ́)

-Mandatory for monosyllabic CVC and disyllabic CVC/CVVC words

-For disyllabic words, only one syllable may contain high tone.

-High tone is (mostly) assigned to the first vowel within the initial syllable. However, high tone may be assigned to the first vowel within the ultimate syllable.

-For trisyllabic words, high tone is (mostly) assigned to the ultimate syllable. However, high tone may be assigned to BOTH initial and ultimate syllables.

References
Wondwosen Tesfaye Abire. 2006. Aspects of Diraytata Morphology and Syntax: A Lexical-Functional Grammar Approach.  University of Trondheim, doctoral thesis.

External links 
Klaus Wedekind, "Sociolinguistic Survey Report of the Languages of the Gawwada (Dullay), Diraasha (Gidole), Muusiye (Bussa) Areas" SIL Electronic Survey Reports: SILESR 2002-065 (contains a word-list of Dirasha, with 320 entries)

East Cushitic languages
Languages of Ethiopia